Box TV Limited is a UK-based production company specialising in film and television drama, subsidiary of production and distribution group DCD Media. Founded in 2000 by award-winning producer Gub Neal, formerly Head of Drama at Channel 4 and Controller of Drama at Granada Television, Box TV's core team also included executive producers Justin Thomson-Glover and Patrick Irwin. The team were joined by Adrian Bate, formerly Head of Film & Drama at Zenith Entertainment, in October 2006.

Box TV was acquired in December 2005 by DCD Media. Box TV has since been merged into DCD Drama and its core team have all left.

Programmes 
Notable Box TV productions include:

 Affinity one off drama starring Zoe Tapper and Anna Madeley for ITV1 based on the novel by Sarah Waters
 The Last Enemy starring Max Beesley and Robert Carlyle for BBC One
 The Wind in the Willows adaptation of Kenneth Grahame's classic of children's literature starring Matt Lucas and Bob Hoskins for BBC One (Christmas drama 2006/audience 5.3m)
 Bon Voyage for ITV1 (broadcast in October 2006/ audience 4.4m)
 Sweeney Todd starring Ray Winstone for BBC One, (broadcast December 2005/audience 6.6m)
 Gunpowder, Treason and Plot

Awards 
In June 2008 Anna Madeley won Best Actress' award at the Monte Carlo Television Festival for her role in Affinity. 
In June 2007 Bon Voyage won Best Mini-Series award at the Monte Carlo Television Festival. Other awards include FIPA Awards 2005 – Fipa d’Or for Gunpowder, Treason and Plot

References

External links
 Box TV
 DCD Media

Television production companies of the United Kingdom